Alopoglossus amazonius, the Amazonanian teiid, is a species of lizard in the family Alopoglossidae. It is endemic to Brazil.

References

Alopoglossus
Reptiles of Brazil
Endemic fauna of Brazil
Reptiles described in 1924
Taxa named by Alexander Grant Ruthven